Darts is a throwing game.

Darts may also refer to:

 Darts (band)
 Darts (album), by Benevento/Russo Duo, 2003
 "Darts", a song by System of a Down on the album System of a Down, 1998
 Doctor of Arts (D.Arts), a doctoral degree
 Differentiable ARchiTecture Search, a neural architecture search method

See also
 Dart (disambiguation)